Cheranelloor Vanadurga Kavu is a Hindu temple under the auspices of the Mathrippillil family.  It is over 400 years old.  It is situated near Cheranelloor Bhagavathy Temple.  Associated with this is a 'Sarppa Kavu' - a Naga Temple.  There is also a Bhadrakali Prathistha.  Every month as per the Malayalam calendar on the first day, first Friday, last Tuesday and on the day 'Revati' star falls, a Puja is held at the Cheranelloor Vanadurga Kavu.

Hindu temples in Ernakulam district